Elias Murr (born 30 January 1962) is a Lebanese politician and an International political figure.

Early life and education
Murr was born on 30 January 1962 in Bteghrine. He is the son of former deputy prime minister and interior minister, Michel Murr. He holds a master's degree in law.

Political career
Elias Murr started his political career as the mayor of Bteghrine, his hometown, from 1982 till 1996.

From 2000 to 2005 Murr was Deputy Prime Minister and Minister of the Interior and Municipalities, replacing his father Michel Murr.
In 2001 he oversaw the drafting and signature of the International Labour Organization at the convention to execute the Action program to protect working children and to combat and eliminate child labor.
During his ministry, Murr was appointed acting minister of foreign affairs.

Murr was appointed Deputy Prime Minister and Minister of National Defense from 2005 and 2008.

Murr supports international police cooperation, and served from 2000 to 2004 as president of the Arab Interior Minister Council, which coordinates internal security and crime fighting among Arab nations.

In 2009, Elias Murr was appointed Deputy Prime Minister and Defense Minister.

In 2010, Murr was a member of the Lebanese National Dialogue committee.

In October 2013, Murr was appointed the President of the Board of the Interpol Foundation for a Safer World, which aims to strengthen the capabilities of Interpol to fight money laundering, organized crime and financing of terrorism.

Murr took part in many negotiations with the United Nations, and oversaw the deployment of 25,000 soldiers for the implementation of UNSC resolution 1701, preserving the cease fire mandated by the international community.
Elias Murr is an honored officer of the National Cedar Legion and the holder of the Grand Cross of the Order of Spain.

Assassination attempt

On 12 July 2005, Murr was targeted by a circa 20-kg improvised explosive device in the city of Antelias, 5 km north of Beirut. 12 people were injured, and one person was killed by the explosion that almost took the life of the Deputy Prime Minister at the time. Murr said that he knew an attempt on his life had been planned for months, and had informed the state security services.

Business activities
In parallel with his political endeavors, Murr spent the past twenty years at the helm of "Group Murr", founded in 1957 by his father as a construction company operating in the public works sector.

Group Murr is featured in Forbes' "Top 100 Making An Impact in the Arab World" list.

In 2015, the group holds more than 25 companies, operating across three continents and a wide range of segments of the international market, including: Construction, real estate and resort development, engineering, consumer products, aviation services, security, commercial services for the shipping industry.

Murr also serves as the chairman of the board of the Al Joumhouria News Corporation, the publisher of one of Lebanon's leading daily newspapers and of several other thematic periodicals.

After stopping publications throughout the Lebanese civil war, under H.E. Murr's leadership the Al Joumhouria newspaper, saw its rebirth in 2011, and became the first Lebanese newspaper to embrace new media, by developing proprietary mobile applications, push notifications, and developing an award-winning website for its digital edition.
Murr is also the chairman of the board of Pan Arab News; a website currently under construction, marrying innovation and creativity with using smart technologies to offer its users a unique experience. Pan Arab News will tackle Middle East news as well as the latest events in the Gulf Region.

WikiLeaks accusations
In December 2010, a Lebanese Newspaper posted on its website cables from WikiLeaks revealing that Murr had separated the army from Hezbollah if a new war was to erupt on Israel's northern border. He is quoted as having said:

"Israel would do well to avoid two things when it comes for Hizballah. One, it must not touch the Blue Line or the UNSCR 1701 areas as this will keep Hizballah out of these areas. Two, Israel cannot bomb bridges and infrastructure in the Christian areas. The Christians were supporting Israel in 2006 until they started bombing their bridges. If Israel has to bomb all of these places in the Shia areas as a matter of operational concern, that is Hizballah's problem."

During the two and a half hours conversation, Murr seemed intent on ensuring the Army stays out of the way so that Hizballah bears the full weight of an Israeli offensive; Murr wanted to spare the army from a war against Israel, as he said in one of the leaked cables: ´'I do not want thousands of our soldiers to die for no reason.'"

References

1962 births
Living people
People from Matn District
Government ministers of Lebanon
Greek Orthodox Christians from Lebanon
Terrorist incidents in Lebanon in 2005
2005 crimes in Lebanon
Defense ministers of Lebanon
Interior ministers of Lebanon
Deputy prime ministers of Lebanon